"Rectifier" is a song by American alternative metal band Ra. The song was released as the second single from the band's debut From One. "Rectifier" was a modest success on the Billboard rock charts, but failed to match the success of previous single "Do You Call My Name", only reaching no. 30 on the Mainstream Rock chart.

An early version of "Rectifier" appeared on the band's debut EP One.

Music video
The song's music video shows the band performing it live at various shows during the 2003 tour with Seether.

Track listing

Chart positions

Personnel
Sahaj – lead vocals, guitar
Ben Carroll – guitar
Sean Corcoran – bass, backing vocals
Skoota Warner – drums

References

Ra (American band) songs
2002 songs
2003 singles
Republic Records singles
Universal Music Group singles
Songs written by Sahaj (musician)